Annette Poulsen (born 29 July 1969) is a retired Danish swimmer who won two medals in the 4 × 200 m freestyle relay at the World and European championships in 1991. She also competed at the 1988 and 1992 Summer Olympics in four events; her best achievement was sixth place in the 4 × 100 m freestyle relay in 1992.

References

1969 births
Danish female swimmers
Swimmers at the 1988 Summer Olympics
Swimmers at the 1992 Summer Olympics
Danish female freestyle swimmers
Olympic swimmers of Denmark
Living people
European Aquatics Championships medalists in swimming
World Aquatics Championships medalists in swimming